James "Jaimz" Woolvett (born April 14, 1967) is a Canadian actor. Woolvett's highest-profile role was the Schofield Kid, a near-sighted aspiring gun-fighter in Clint Eastwood's Academy Award-winning Western Unforgiven (1992).  He has a younger brother, Gordon Michael Woolvett, and a sister Tammy Woolvett.

Filmography

Film

Television

References

External links
 Jaimzwoolvett.com
 

1967 births
Living people
Canadian male film actors
Canadian male television actors
Canadian male video game actors
Canadian male voice actors
Male actors from Hamilton, Ontario
20th-century Canadian male actors
21st-century Canadian male actors